Eisenhower High School is a public secondary school in Goddard, Kansas, United States.  It is operated by Goddard USD 265 school district and serves students of grades 9 to 12. The school mascot is the Tiger and the school colors are black and Columbia blue.

History
In 2011, the high school was completed, and was opened for students in August 2011.  It is one of twelve schools in the Goddard Unified School District.

See also
 List of high schools in Kansas
 List of unified school districts in Kansas
Other high schools in Goddard USD 265 school district
 Goddard High School in Goddard

References

External links
 Official school website
 USD 265, school district
 USD 265 School District Boundary Map, KDOT
 Goddard City Map, KDOT

Schools in Sedgwick County, Kansas
Public high schools in Kansas
Educational institutions established in 2011
2011 establishments in Kansas